Hermann Dür (23 June 1925 – 25 August 2015) was a Swiss equestrian. He competed in two events at the 1972 Summer Olympics.

References

External links
 

1925 births
2015 deaths
Swiss male equestrians
Swiss dressage riders
Olympic equestrians of Switzerland
Equestrians at the 1972 Summer Olympics
Place of birth missing
20th-century Swiss people